Kent Erik Larsson (born 10 June 1963) is a retired Swedish athlete who specialised in the shot put. He represented his country at the 1992 and 1996 Summer Olympics as well as one indoor and three outdoor World Championships.

His personal bests in the event are 20.03 metres outdoors (Kvarnsveden 1993) and 18.42 metres indoors (Genoa 1992).

Competition record

References

1963 births
Living people
People from Östersund
Swedish male shot putters
World Athletics Championships athletes for Sweden
Athletes (track and field) at the 1992 Summer Olympics
Athletes (track and field) at the 1996 Summer Olympics
Olympic athletes of Sweden
Sportspeople from Jämtland County